Wei Jingxing (born 18 March 1993) is a Chinese footballer currently playing as a forward for Jiangxi Beidamen.

Career statistics

Club
.

Notes

References

1993 births
Living people
Chinese footballers
Association football forwards
China League Two players
China League One players
Guangdong Sunray Cave F.C. players
Shenzhen F.C. players
Shanghai Sunfun F.C. players
Jiangxi Beidamen F.C. players